The Hayes Barton Historic District is a neighborhood located northwest of downtown Raleigh, North Carolina. The neighborhood design includes roads fitted to the contours of the land and features several public parks. The Hayes Barton neighborhood is roughly bounded by St. Mary's St., Fairview Rd., W. Roanoke Park Dr. (renamed in 2020, formerly Aycock St.), Scales St. and Williamson Dr. In 2002, the district was listed on the National Register of Historic Places.

Notable buildings 
 Jolly-Broughton House

Notable residents 
Alice Willson Broughton, First Lady of North Carolina
J. Melville Broughton, Governor of North Carolina and U.S. Senator

See also
 Five Points Historic Neighborhoods (Raleigh, North Carolina)
 List of Registered Historic Places in North Carolina

References

External links
 National Register Historic Districts in Raleigh, North Carolina, RHDC
 Five Points Historic District, RHDC

Historic districts on the National Register of Historic Places in North Carolina
Neighborhoods in Raleigh, North Carolina
Neoclassical architecture in North Carolina
Colonial Revival architecture in North Carolina
National Register of Historic Places in Raleigh, North Carolina